Ferdi Hardal (born 31 December 1996) is a Turkish weightlifter competing in the 61 kg division. He obtained a quota for the 2020 Summer Olympics.

Sport career
Hardal is a member of Gaziantep GSİM Club.

He won two bronze medals in the 56 kg Clean & Jerk event and in Total events of the 2014 European Junior & U23 Championships in Limassol, Cyprus, two silver medals in the 62 kg Snatch event and in Total of the 2016 European Junior & U23 Championships in Eilat, Israel, the silver medal in the 62 kg Clean & Jerk event of the 2017 European Junior & U23 Championships in Durrës, Albania, the gold medal in 62 kg Snatch, the bronze medal in the Clean & Jerk event, the silver medal in Totak of the 2018 European Junior & U23 Championships in Zamość, Poland, and the silver medal in the 61 kg Snatch event of the 2019 European Junior & U23 Championships in Bucharest, Romania.

He competed at the 2018 World Championships in Ashgabat, Turkmenistan, and at the 2019 World Championships in Pattaya, Thailand.

At the 2019 European Championships in Batumi, Georgia, he took the bronze medal in the 61 kg Snatch, the silver medal in Clean & Jerk and the bronze medal in Total. He won the bronze medal at the 2021 European Championships in Moscow, Russia.

Hardal obtained a quota for the 2020 Summer Olympics.

He won the gold medal in the men's 61 kg Snatch and Clean & Jerk events at the 2022 Mediterranean Games held in Oran, Algeria.

References

External links
 

1996 births
Living people
Sportspeople from Gaziantep
Turkish male weightlifters
European Weightlifting Championships medalists
Mediterranean Games medalists in weightlifting
Mediterranean Games gold medalists for Turkey
Competitors at the 2022 Mediterranean Games
20th-century Turkish people
21st-century Turkish people
Islamic Solidarity Games competitors for Turkey
Islamic Solidarity Games medalists in weightlifting